Whitechapel was a parliamentary constituency in the Whitechapel district of East London. In 1885 the seat was established as a division of the parliamentary borough of Tower Hamlets. It returned one Member of Parliament (MP) to the House of Commons of the Parliament of the United Kingdom.

History and Boundaries
The constituency was created by the Redistribution of Seats Act 1885 for the 1885 general election, and abolished for the 1918 general election.

Whitechapel is part of the historic county of Middlesex, in the far east of the county. The constituency was on the north bank of the River Thames. It was bordered by the constituencies of: City of London to the west; Hoxton & Bethnal Green South West to the north; and Stepney & St George's in the East to the east.

From 1889 the district was included in the administrative County of London. In 1900 the constituency became part of the Metropolitan Borough of Stepney.

In the redistribution of 1918 Whitechapel was incorporated in a new Whitechapel and St George's constituency.

Members of Parliament

Elections

Elections in the 1880s

Elections in the 1890s

Elections in the 1900s

Elections in the 1910s

 
General Election 1914–15:

Another General Election was required to take place before the end of 1915. The political parties had been making preparations for an election to take place and by the autumn of  1914, the following candidates had been selected; 
Liberal: Stuart Samuel
Unionist:

References

 Boundaries of Parliamentary Constituencies 1885-1972, compiled and edited by F.W.S. Craig (Parliamentary Reference Publications 1972)
 British Parliamentary Election Results 1885-1918, compiled and edited by F.W.S. Craig (Macmillan Press 1974)
 Who's Who of British Members of Parliament, Volume II 1886-1918, edited by M. Stenton and S. Lees (Harvester Press 1978)
 Who's Who of British Members of Parliament, Volume III 1919-1945, edited by M. Stenton and S. Lees (Harvester Press 1979)

Politics of the London Borough of Tower Hamlets
Parliamentary constituencies in London (historic)
Constituencies of the Parliament of the United Kingdom established in 1885
Constituencies of the Parliament of the United Kingdom disestablished in 1918
Whitechapel